The New Sarawak State Legislative Assembly Building is the current state legislative complex of Sarawak, in Kuching, Malaysia. It houses the Sarawak State Legislative Assembly, where state assemblymen from all over Sarawak meet and preside over debates and passing of laws.

The complex is at the north bank of the Sarawak River in between The Astana, which is the official residence of the Yang di-Pertua Negeri (Governor) of Sarawak, and Fort Margherita.

The building was officially opened by the Yang di-Pertuan Agong (King) of Malaysia, Tuanku Mizan Zainal Abidin of Terengganu, on 27 July 2009, followed by the Rulers' Conference in the building complex.

History

The groundbreaking ceremony of the building was held in September 2004. The main project developers were Naim Cendera and PPES Works. The building was handed over to the Sarawak government in May 2009. The building cost RM 296.5 million to build.

The opening ceremony of the building was held in July 2009 with a river float parade, fireworks, and the purchase of luxury cars which will be used by respective state government departments. The ceremony was attended by the King of Malaysia and broadcast live nationwide.

The Sarawak government added the Darul Hana bridge across the Sarawak river near the building in 2017. In 2018, the Darul Hana musical fountain was added in front of the state assembly building.

Architecture
The building has nine floors with a height of 27.7 metres, diameter of 30.9 metres, and an area of 760 square metres. The speaker of the state assembly, Dato Sri Mohd Asfia Awang Nassar, said that the building would last for 100 years. The cross-section of the building is designed like a nine-pointed star. The building is capped with a roof design similar to a Malaysian royal umbrella (payung negara in Malay).

The public viewing gallery is located on the ninth floor. The Sarawak state legislative assembly is located on the eighth floor. The state assembly members lounge is located on the 7th floor. Meanwhile, the lower floors house offices for the state assembly members, function halls, meeting rooms, an auditorium, and a surau. The state legislative assembly chamber can hold up to 108 members, each with their own office. It also has 142 seats for civil servants, a ceremonial hall accommodating 300 people, banquet hall with a capacity of 1,000 people, a car park for 315 vehicles, and a parade ground.

See also
 The Astana, Sarawak
 Sarawak State Legislative Assembly
 Wisma Bapa Malaysia

References

Sarawak State Legislative Assembly
Buildings and structures in Kuching
2009 establishments in Malaysia
State secretariat buildings in Malaysia
Government buildings completed in 2009